Patrick Connell is an American diplomat who became Chargé d’Affaires ad interim under the Biden administration at the Embassy of the United States to the Holy See on January 20, 2021, succeeding former ambassador Callista Gingrich. Connell is currently a career member of the United States Foreign Service and had previously served as Deputy Chief of Mission at the embassy from July 2020 until his promotion.

Early life
Patrick Connell was born in Westford, Massachusetts. He had received a Bachelor of Arts in Religious Studies and English from Villanova University and a Juris Doctor from the Villanova University School of Law.

Awards
Connell is the recipient of several State Department Superior and Meritorious Honor awards and in 2015 had been awarded the Sinclaire Language Award for Greek and Turkish.

References

United States Foreign Service personnel
Living people
Year of birth missing (living people)
People from Westford, Massachusetts
Villanova University School of Law alumni
Ambassadors of the United States to the Holy See
21st-century American diplomats